The Prix Alain-Fournier is a French literary prize, awarded by the town of Saint-Amand-Montrond in honour of Alain-Fournier, author of Le Grand Meaulnes. It is intended to give encouragement to a novelist at the beginning of their career, and it can be awarded for first, second or third novels, provided that the author has not previously received any recognition at a national level.

Prize-winners

1986 – Pierre Bergounioux, Ce pas et le suivant (Gallimard) 
1987 – Jean Lods, Le Bleu des vitraux (Gallimard) 
1988 – Richard Jorif, Le Navire Argo (François Bourin) 
1989 – Luce Tillier, L'Ordre troublant des nénuphars (Kupczyk) 
1990 – Philippe Delerm, Autumn (Le Rocher) 
1991 – Anne-Marie Garat, Chambre noire (Flammarion) 
1992 – Régine Detambel, Le Long Séjour (Julliard) 
1993 – Amélie Nothomb, Hygiène de l'assassin (Albin Michel) 
1994 – Alain Delbe, Les Îles jumelles (Éditions Phébus) 
1995 – Nicolas Kieffer, Peau de lapin (Seuil) 
1996 – Xavier Hanotte, Manière noire (Belfond) 
1997 – Dominique Sigaud, L'Hypothèse du désert (Gallimard) 
1998 – Laurent Ardenne, Le Mal de Malifaut (Le Temps des Cerises) 
1999 – Louis Maspero, Une île au bord du désert (L'Aube) 
2000 – Joël Egloff, Edmond Ganglion & fils (Le Rocher) 
2001 – Adeline Yzac, Le Dernier de la Lune (Le Rouergue) 
2002 – Véronique Olmi, Bord de mer (Actes Sud) 
2003 – Dominique Mainard, Leur histoire (Joëlle Losfeld) 
2004 – Jean-Louis Serrano, Le Monde m'était promis (Editions de l'Aube) 
2005 – Karine Mazloumian, Tanguer (Plon) 
2006 – Hélène Bonafous-Murat, Morsures (Editions Le Passage) 
2007 – Laurence Tardieu, Puisque rien ne dure (Editions Stock) 
2008 – Karima Berger, Filiations dangereuses (Editions Chèvre-feuille étoilée)
2009 – Yasmine Char, La main de Dieu (Gallimard)
2010 – Tatiana Arfel, L'Attente du soir (José Corti)
2011 – Pierre Cendors, Engeland (Finitude)
2012 – Yamen Manai, La Sérénade d'Ibrahim Santos (Elyzad)
2013 - Gaëlle Josse, Nos vies désaccordées (Éditions Autrement)
2014 - Gaël Brunet, La Battue (Rouergue)
2015 – Marie-Aimée Lebreton, Cent-sept ans (Buchet/Chastel)
2016 – Cécile Huguenin, La Saison des mangues (Heloïse d'Ormesson)
2017 – Guy Boley, Fils de feu (Grasset)
2018 – Jean-Baptiste Andrea, Ma Reine (L'Iconoclaste)
2019 – Bruno Pellegrino, Là-bas, août est un mois d’automne (éditions Zoél)

See also
List of French literary awards

References

French fiction awards
Awards established in 1986